Mount Corcoran is a  mountain summit located on the crest of the Sierra Nevada mountain range in California. It is situated on the boundary between Tulare County and Inyo County, as well as the boundary between Sequoia National Park and John Muir Wilderness.

Climate
According to the Köppen climate classification system, Mount Corcoran has an alpine climate. Most weather fronts originate in the Pacific Ocean, and travel east toward the Sierra Nevada mountains. As fronts approach, they are forced upward by the peaks, causing them to drop their moisture in the form of rain or snowfall onto the range (orographic lift). Precipitation runoff from this mountain drains west to the Kern River via Rock Creek, and east to Owens Valley via Tuttle Creek.

History
The mountain known today as Mount Langley was named Mount Corcoran in 1868 by artistic painter Albert Bierstadt in honor of William Wilson Corcoran (1839–1923), an American banker, philanthropist, and art collector. 1891 and 1933 decision descriptions by the United States Board on Geographic Names placed the Corcoran name at what is now known as Mount Langley. A 1968 board decision officially applied the Mount Corcoran name to the highest and northernmost of four pinnacles on the ridge immediately south of Mount Le Conte and north of Mt. Langley.

The first ascent of the summit was made in 1933 by Howard S. Gates.

Gallery

See also
 
 List of mountain peaks of California

References

External links
 Weather forecast: Mount Corcoran

Mountains of Tulare County, California
Mountains of Sequoia National Park
Inyo National Forest
Mountains of Inyo County, California
Mountains of the John Muir Wilderness
North American 4000 m summits
Mountains of Northern California
Sierra Nevada (United States)